Wabe or WABE may refer to:

Rivers 
 Wabe (Schunter), a river of Lower Saxony, Germany
 Wabe River, a river of south-central Ethiopia

Media 
 WABE (FM), a radio station (90.1 FM) in Atlanta, Georgia, United States
 WABE-TV, a television station (channel 30) in Atlanta, Georgia, United States

Other uses 
 Wabe language, a language of Mexico
 Wabe (nonce word), a nonsense word coined by Lewis Carroll
 Wabe (given name), a Frisian male given name
 Ashea Wabe, (1871–1908) a belly dancer in New York City
 The Wabe, a house in London, England